Fascher is a surname. Notable people with the surname include:

Horst Fascher (born 1936), German music manager
Marc Fascher (born 1968), German football manager and former player
Willy Fascher (born 1912), German fencer

References